The African Military Cup, also known as the Comparoé Trophy, is a football competition for national military teams in Africa, and was first held in 1994. It is organized by Organisation of Military Sport in Africa (OSMA), a branch of the International Military Sports Council. In French-speaking countries it is also known as CAMFOOT (Coupe d'Afrique Militaire de Football).
The tournament acts as qualification for the World Military Cup or the World Military Games.

Results

Successful national teams

See also
 Americas Military Cup
 World Military Cup
 Africa Military Games, also organised by OMSA

External links
RSSSF

International association football competitions in Africa
Recurring sporting events established in 1994
Military association football competitions